La Madre Mountain Wilderness Area consists of  covering a part of Clark County,  Nevada, that lies just west of the city of Las Vegas, between that city and Mount Charleston. The area includes La Madre Mountain and several archaeological areas including the Brownstone Canyon Archaeological District.  The area is administered by the Humboldt-Toiyabe National Forest and the Bureau of Land Management.

See also
Nevada Wilderness Areas
List of wilderness areas in Nevada

References

External links
 official Humboldt-Toiyabe National Forest website
 National Atlas: Map of Humboldt-Toiyabe National Forest (archive)
 Friends of Nevada Wilderness (archive)

Humboldt–Toiyabe National Forest
Wilderness areas of Nevada
Protected areas of Clark County, Nevada
Bureau of Land Management areas in Nevada
IUCN Category Ib